Robert "Robb" Brent (born February 6, 1987) is an American professional stock car racing driver who most recently competed in what is now the ARCA Menards Series in 2011. He competed full-time in the same series in 2009 and 2010, finishing tenth and eleventh in points, respectively, those years. He also made three starts in the NASCAR Truck Series in 2008 and one Nationwide (now Xfinity) Series start in 2010.

Career

Brent was called by RAB Racing to drive their No. 09 Ford at the road course race at Road America in 2010. The team, which was running multiple drivers that year, had already signed Boris Said to drive those races for them, but he was unavailable for this race, because he instead opted to compete in the Cup Series road course race at Sonoma instead, which was on the same weekend as the Road America Nationwide race. In looking for a driver, Said and RAB owner Robby Benton chose Brent, a full-time ARCA Racing Series driver for Allgaier Motorsports, after his strong finishes in the road course races in that series at Palm Beach and New Jersey Motorsports Park earlier in the season.

Personal life
Brent lives in Shelby Township, Michigan and graduated from Eisenhower High School in 2005, according to his Facebook page. He then went on to attend Northwood University, graduating in 2009 with a degree in automotive marketing. According to his LinkedIn profile, he has worked as the Human Resources Coordinator at Central Transport (a company located in the Detroit metropolitan area) since January 2020, and prior to that, was the Vice President and the Internet Manager of the Orchard Chrysler Dodge Jeep RAM dealership in Washington Township, Michigan (the town north of Shelby).

Motorsports career results

NASCAR
(key) (Bold – Pole position awarded by qualifying time. Italics – Pole position earned by points standings or practice time. * – Most laps led.)

Nationwide Series

 Season still in progress
 Ineligible for series points

Craftsman Truck Series

ARCA Racing Series

References

External links
 

1987 births
NASCAR drivers
ARCA Menards Series drivers
Living people
Racing drivers from Michigan